Howard Charles Linney Barber (1877 – 12 April 1950) was an English-born Australian politician.

He was born in Birmingham. In 1931 he was elected to the Tasmanian House of Assembly as a Nationalist member for Bass. He resigned in 1933. He died in 1950 in Mount Gambier, South Australia.

References

1877 births
1950 deaths
Nationalist Party of Australia members of the Parliament of Tasmania
Members of the Tasmanian House of Assembly
British emigrants to Australia